SENSE or LOVE is Hey! Say! JUMP's sixth album; released 2 years after their previous album, DEAR. It was released on August 22, 2018 and is the first album with 8 members after Keito Okamoto's decision to go into hiatus and continue his studies in the United States of America.

Album information

SENSE or LOVE takes "dance" as its theme. It features a lead track titled "BANGER NIGHT." The song is described as the group's most aggressive dance. The album will also includes 16 songs including their previously released singles: "White Love," "Maeomuke," and "Precious Girl." The group's latest single that was released on August 1, "COSMIC☆HUMAN," is not included. The limited edition includes 8 solo songs from each members (excluding Okamoto) and a music video and making of "BANGER NIGHT," and a special packaging with a 60-page photo booklet and lyrics. The first press regular includes 2 bonus tracks each from the group's sub units Hey! Say! 7 and Hey! Say! BEST and the regular edition includes a bonus track and a poster-ype foldable lyric booklet.

Track list

References

External links
SENSE or LOVE special page 
SENSE or LOVE at Johnny's net 

2018 albums
Hey! Say! JUMP albums